The 1989 World Junior Curling Championships were held from March 19 to 25 in Markham, Ontario, Canada.

It was the first World Junior Championships to include teams from Italy.

Men

Teams

Round Robin

Tiebreakers

Playoffs

Rankings

Women

Teams

Round Robin

Tiebreaker

Playoffs

Rankings

Awards

WJCC All-Star Team:

WJCC Sportsmanship Award:

Sources

1989 in Canadian curling
World Junior Curling Championships
Curling competitions in Ontario
Sport in Markham, Ontario
International curling competitions hosted by Canada
March 1989 sports events in Canada
1989 in youth sport
1989 in Ontario